Tidewater News is a newspaper based in Franklin, Virginia covering Franklin, Southampton County and Isle of Wight County. Since November, 2006, it has been published three days a week.

External links
The Tidewater News

Newspapers published in Virginia
Franklin, Virginia